Lucy Webb is an American comedienne and actress, most famous for her work on the 1980s HBO series Not Necessarily the News. She was raised in Cookeville, Tennessee. She has appeared in multiple films and television programs, including Corrina, Corrina, where she portrayed Shirl.

She was married to actor Kevin Pollak. They separated in 2005, and in 2008, Pollak filed for a divorce.

References

External links

Living people
American women comedians
Place of birth missing (living people)
Year of birth missing (living people)
20th-century American comedians
21st-century American comedians
American film actresses
American television actresses
20th-century American actresses
21st-century American actresses
People from Cookeville, Tennessee
Actresses from Tennessee
Comedians from Tennessee